The women's long jump at the 2019 Asian Athletics Championships was held on 22 April.

Results

References

Long
Long jump at the Asian Athletics Championships
2019 in women's athletics